Hoplistocerus dichrous is a species of beetle in the family Cerambycidae. It was described by Gounelle in 1906.

References

Anisocerini
Beetles described in 1906